Joseph R. Ecker is an American plant biologist and molecular biologist. He is Professor of Plant Molecular and Cellular Biology Laboratory and Director of the Genomic Analysis Laboratory at the Salk Institute for Biological Studies. He is also an Investigator of the Howard Hughes Medical Institute. He holds the Salk International Council Chair in Genetics.

He is also an Adjunct Professor in the Section of Cell and Developmental Biology at the University of California, San Diego.

Biography 
Ecker completed a BA degree in biology in 1978 at The College of New Jersey. He then joined the laboratory of virologist Dr. Richard Hyman and studied herpes viruses at the Pennsylvania State University College of Medicine. He joined Ronald W. Davis's lab at Stanford University. In 1987, he was appointed as an assistant professor at the Plant Science Institute at the University of Pennsylvania. He also served on the Life Sciences jury for the Infosys Prize in 2017.

Notable honors and awards 
2011 Investigator, Howard Hughes Medical Institute and the Gordon and Betty Moore Foundation
2011 George W. Beadle Award, Genetics Society of America
2009 #2 Scientific Discovery of the Year 2009 — TIME Magazine
2007 John J. Carty Award for the Advancement of Science

References

External links 
 List of publications and citations at Google Scholar

Living people
21st-century American biologists
Howard Hughes Medical Investigators
Members of the United States National Academy of Sciences
Fellows of the American Academy of Arts and Sciences
Year of birth missing (living people)
Salk Institute for Biological Studies people